The 2014 United States House of Representatives elections in Texas were held on Tuesday, November 4, 2014, to elect the 36 U.S. representatives from the state of Texas, one from each of the state's 36 congressional districts. The elections coincided with the elections of other federal and state offices, including a gubernatorial election and an election to the U.S. Senate.

With 25% of voting age people turning out, all seats except for that of district 23 were retained by their respective parties, with the Republican Party receiving 25 seats and the Democratic Party receiving 11 seats.

Overview

By district
Results of the 2014 United States House of Representatives elections in Texas by district:

District 1

The incumbent, Republican Louie Gohmert, represented the district since 2005. Democrat Shirley McKellar, who lost to Gohmert in 2012, ran for the district's seat again. Gohmert was re-elected with 77.5% of the vote.

Primary results

General election

District 2

The incumbent, Republican Ted Poe, represented the district since 2005. Democrat Niko Letsos and Libertarians Craig Cleveland and James Veasaw ran for the seat. Poe was re-elected with 67.95% of the vote.

Primary results

General election

District 3

The incumbent, Republican Sam Johnson, represented the district since 1991. Three Republicans, businesswoman Cami Dean; network engineer Josh Loveless; and pilot Harry Pierce, who was a candidate for the seat in 2012, ran against him in the Republican primary, which Johnson won. Libertarian Cecil Ince and Green Paul Blair ran for the seat; no Democrat filed to run. Johnson was re-elected with 82.01% of the vote.

Primary results

General election

District 4

The incumbent, Republican Ralph Hall, represented the district since 1981. He was challenged in the Republican primary by John Ratcliffe, Lou Gigliotti, John Stacy, Brent Lawson, and Tony Arterburn, which resulted in a runoff between Hall and Ratcliffe. Ratcliffe won the primary runoff with 52.82% of the vote. Ratcliffe won the election uncontested.

Republican primary

Candidates
At 91 years of age, Hall was the oldest member of the US House of Representatives. Fellow Republican John Ratcliffe, a former Mayor of Heath, and former United States Attorney for the Eastern District of Texas, challenged Hall in the primary election. Also challenging Hall in the Republican primary were John Stacy, former city councillor of Fate City; auto racing part company owner and 2012 candidate Lou Gigliotti; United States Army veteran Tony Arterburn; and engineering manager Brent Lawson.

Results

Runoff

Polling

Results

Hall became the first incumbent Congressman of the 2014 cycle to be defeated in the primary, the oldest Congressman to lose a primary and the only sitting Republican U.S. Representative from Texas to unsuccessfully seek renomination to his or her seat out of 257 attempts since statehood.

General election

Results

District 5

The incumbent, Republican Jeb Hensarling, represented the district since 2003. Libertarian Ken Ashby ran; no Democrat filed to run. Hensarling was re-elected with 85.36% of the vote.

Primary results

General election

District 6

The incumbent, Republican Joe Barton, represented the district since 1985. Barton faced a primary election challenge from Frank Kuchar, with Barton winning 72.66% of the vote. Democrat David Edwin Cozad and Libertarian Hugh Chauvin also ran in the election. Barton was re-elected with 61.15% of the vote.

Primary results

General election

District 7

The incumbent, Republican John Culberson, represented the district since 2001. Energy attorney and nominee for the seat in 2012 James Cargas and activist Lissa Squires ran in the Democratic primary, which Cargas won with 62.19% of the vote. Libertarian Gerald Fowler ran in the election. Culberson was reelected with 63.26% of the vote.

Primary results

General election

District 8

The incumbent, Republican Kevin Brady, represented the district since 1997. Brady was challenged in the primary by Craig McMichael; Brady won with 68.27% of the vote. Libertarian Russ Jones and Ken Petty ran in a petition primary, which Ken Petty won; no Democrat filed to run. Brady was re-elected with 89.32% of the vote.

Primary results

General election

District 9

The incumbent, Democrat Al Green, represented the district since 2005. Green George Reiter and Libertarian Johnny Johnson ran in the election; no Republican filed to run. Green was re-elected with 90.82% of the vote.

Primary results

General election

District 10

The incumbent, Republican Michael McCaul, represented the district since 2005. Democrat Tawana Walter-Cadien and Libertarian Bill Kelsey ran in the election. McCaul was reelected with 62.18% of the vote.

Primary results

General election

District 11

The incumbent, Republican Mike Conaway, represented the district since 2005. Wade Brown ran against Conaway in the primary; Conaway won with 73.7% of the vote. Libertarian Ryan T. Lange ran in the election; no Democrat filed to run. Conaway won with 90.27% of the vote.

Primary results

General election

District 12

The incumbent, Republican Kay Granger, represented the district since 1997. Democrat Mark Greene and Libertarian Ed Colliver ran in the election. Granger was reelected with 71.31% of the vote.

Primary results

General election

District 13

The incumbent, Republican Mac Thornberry, represented the district since 1995. He was challenged for the Republican nomination by Elaine Hays, a businesswoman from Amarilla; and Pam Barlow, a veterinarian from Bowie, Texas. Thornberry won the primary with 68.2% of the vote. Democrat Mike Minter, Green Don Cook and Libertarian Emily Pivoda ran in the election. Thornberry was reelected with 84.32% of the vote.

Primary results

General election

District 14

The incumbent, Republican Randy Weber, represented the district since 2013. Don Brown, Gagan Panjhazari and Buck Willis ran in the Democratic primary; Brown won with 68.23% of the vote. Libertarian John Wieder ran in the election. Weber was reelected with 61.85% of the vote.

Primary results

General election

District 15

The incumbent, Democrat Rubén Hinojosa, represented the district since 1997. Doug Carlile and Eddie Zamora ran in the Republican primary; Zamora won with 54.93% of the vote. Libertarian Johnny Partain ran in the election. Hinojosa was reelected with 54.01% of the vote.

Primary results

General election

District 16

The incumbent, Democrat Beto O'Rourke, represented the district since 2013. Republican Corey Roen and Libertarian Jaime Perez ran in the election. O'Rourke was reelected with 67.49% of the vote.

Primary results

General election

District 17

The incumbent, Republican Bill Flores, represented the district since 2011. Democrat Nick Haynes and Libertarians Shawn Hamilton and Bill Oliver ran in the election. Flores was reelected with 64.58% of the vote.

Primary results

General election

District 18

The incumbent, Democrat Sheila Jackson Lee, represented the district since 1995. Republican Sean Seibert, Green Remington Alessi and Libertarian Jennifer Whelan ran in the election. Lee was reelected with 71.78% of the vote.

Primary results

General election

District 19

The incumbent, Republican Randy Neugebauer, represented the district since 2003. He was challenged in the Republican Party primary by physician Donald May and Chris Winn, a former Chairman of the Lubbock County Republican Party and candidate for the seat in 2012; Neugebauer won with 64.36% of the vote. Democrat Neal Marchbanks of Lubbock, Green Mark Lawson and Libertarian Richard Peterson ran in the election. Neugebauer was reelected with 77.18% of the vote.

Primary results

General election

District 20

The incumbent, Democrat Joaquín Castro, represented the district since 2013. Libertarian Jeffrey Blunt ran in the election; no Republican filed to run. Castro was reelected with 75.66% of the vote.

Primary results

General election

District 21

The incumbent, Republican Lamar S. Smith, represented the district since 1987. He faced businessman Matt McCall and Michael J. Smith in the Republican primary; Smith won with 60.43% of the vote. Green Antonio Diaz and Libertarian Ryan Shields ran in the election. Smith was reelected with 71.78% of the vote.

Primary results

General election

District 22

The incumbent, Republican Pete Olson, represented the district since 2009. Democrats Frank Briscoe and Mark Gibson ran for their party's nomination; Briscoe won with 53.18% of the vote. Libertarian Rob Lapham ran in the election. Olson was reelected with 66.55% of the vote.

Primary results

General election

District 23

The incumbent, Democrat Pete Gallego, represented the district since 2013. Will Hurd, Robert Lowry, and Quico Canseco ran in the Republican primary; Hurd and Canseco had a runoff which Hurd won with 59.46% of the vote. Libertarian Ruben Corvalan ran in the election. Hurd was elected with 49.78% of the vote, making this the only U.S. House seat in Texas to flip in 2014.

Republican primary
Soon after the 2012 election, Republicans began recruiting new candidates to challenge Gallego in 2014, including Rolando Pablos, a public utility commissioner and former Chairman of the board for the Museo Alameda. Pablos declined to run but Canseco filed to run again. Two other Republicans, Dr. Robert Lowry and former CIA officer Will Hurd, who was a candidate for the seat in 2010 also ran.

Results

Runoff

Results

Democratic primary

General election

District 24

The incumbent, Republican Kenny Marchant, represented the district since 2005. Democrat Patrick McGehearty and Libertarian Mike Kolls ran in the election. Marchant was reelected with 65.04% of the vote.

Primary results

General election

District 25

The incumbent, Republican Roger Williams, who has represented the district since 2013. Stuart Gourd and Marco Montoya ran in the Democratic primary; Montoya won with 75.16% of the vote. Libertarian John Betz ran in the election. Williams was reelected with 60.22% of the vote.

Primary results

General election

District 26

The incumbent, Republican Michael C. Burgess, represented the district since 2003. He was challenged in the Republican primary by Joel A. Krause and Divenchy Watrous; Burgess won with 82.62% of the vote. Libertarian Mark Boler ran in the election; no Democrat filed to run. Burgess was reelected with 82.66% of the vote.

Primary results

General election

District 27

The incumbent, Republican Blake Farenthold, represented the district since 2011. Democrat Wesley Reed and Libertarian Roxanne Simonson ran in the election. Farenthold was reelected with 63.60% of the vote.

Primary results

General election

District 28

The incumbent, Democrat Henry Cuellar, represented the district since 2005. Green Michael Cary and Libertarian Jaime Perez ran in the election; no Republican filed to run. Cuellar was reelected with 82.1% of the vote.

Primary results

General election

District 29

The 21 year establishment incumbent, Democrat Gene Green, has won the district since 1993. Libertarian Constitutionalist James Stanczak ran in the election in 2012 and 2014, and placed second both times. Despite Stanczak having the largest ever turnout by conservatives and liberals for a third party, Green was reelected with 89.55% of the vote.

Primary results

General election

District 30

The incumbent, Democrat Eddie Bernice Johnson, represented the district since 1993. State Representative Barbara Mallory Caraway, who was a candidate for the seat in 2012, challenged Johnson in the Democratic primary for a second time; Johnson won with 69.92% of the vote. Libertarian Max Koch III and independent Eric LeMonte Williams ran in the election; no Republican filed to run. Johnson was reelected with 87.95% of the vote.

Primary results

General election

District 31

The incumbent, Republican John Carter, who has represented the district since 2003. Democrat Louie Minor and Libertarian Scott Ballard ran in the election. Carter was reelected with 64.05% of the vote.

Primary results

General election

District 32

The incumbent, Republican Pete Sessions, represented the district since 2003, and previously represented the 5th district from 1997 to 2003. Katrina Pierson, a Tea Party activist, challenged Sessions for the Republican nomination; Sessions won with 63.61% of the vote. Democratic attorney Frank Perez and Libertarian Edward Rankin ran in the election. Sessions was reelected with 61.82% of the vote.

Primary results

General election

District 33

The incumbent, Democrat Marc Veasey, represented the district since 2013. Libertarian Jason Reeves ran in the election. No Republican filed to run. Veasey was reelected with 86.51% of the vote.

Primary results

General election

District 34

The incumbent, Democrat Filemon Vela Jr., represented the district since 2013. Republican Larry Smith and Libertarian Ryan Rowley ran in the election. Vela was reelected with 59.47% of the vote.

Primary results

General election

District 35

The incumbent, Democrat Lloyd Doggett, represented the district since 2013 and previously represented the 25th district from 2005 to 2013 and the 10th district from 1995 to 2005. Republican Susan Narvaiz, Green Kat Swift and Libertarian Cory Bruner ran in the election. Doggett was reelected with 62.48% of the vote.

Primary results

General election

District 36

The incumbent, Republican Steve Stockman, represented the district since 2013 and previously represented the 9th district from 1995 to 1997. Stockman did not run for reelection. John Amdur, Brian Babin, Doug Centilli, Jim Engstrand, Phil Fitzgerald, Pat Kasprzak, John Manlove, Chuck Meyer, Kim Morrell, Dave Norman, Robin Riley, and Ben Streusand ran in the Republican primary; a runoff between Ben Streusand and Brian Babin was held which Babin won with 57.84% of the vote. Democrat Michael K. Cole, who ran as a Libertarian in 2012, Libertarian Rodney Veach, and Green Hal J. Ridley Jr. ran in the election. Babin won the election with 75.96% of the vote.

Republican primary
At the deadline to file for the 2014 elections, Stockman chose to challenge John Cornyn for the United States Senate, rather than run for re-election.

Candidates
 John Amdur, attorney and Nassau Bay city councillor
 Brian Babin, dentist, former Mayor of Woodville and nominee for Texas's 2nd congressional district in 1996 and 1998
 Doug Centilli, former Chief of Staff to U.S. Representative Kevin Brady
 Jim Engstrand, businessman, retired Army Colonel and candidate for the seat in 2012
 Phil Fitzgerald, construction business owner and former Liberty County judge
 Pat Kasprzak, high school teacher and former banker
 John Manlove, businessman, former Mayor of Pasadena and candidate for Texas's 22nd congressional district in 2008
 Chuck Meyer, lawyer, candidate for the seat in 2012 and Independent candidate for Texas's 18th congressional district in 2010
 Kim Morrell, former Seabrook city councillor and candidate for the seat in 2012
 Dave Norman, insurance agent, nominee for the State House in 1996 and 1998 and candidate for the State Senate in 2012
 Robin Riley, oil and gas executive, former NASA contractor and former Mayor of Seabrook
 Ben Streusand, mortgage banker and candidate for Texas's 10th congressional district in 2004

Results

Runoff

Results

Democratic primary

Results

General election

See also
 2014 United States House of Representatives elections
 2014 United States elections

References

External links
 U.S. House elections in Texas, 2014 at Ballotpedia
 Campaign contributions at OpenSecrets

Texas
2014
United States House of Representatives